A fish pond or fishpond is a controlled pond, small artificial lake or retention basin that is stocked with fish and is used in aquaculture for fish farming, for recreational fishing, or for ornamental purposes.

Fish ponds are a classical garden feature in East Asian residence, such as the Classical Gardens of Suzhou of China, the Imperial Palace of Japan and the Gyeongbokgung Palace of South Korea.  In Medieval Europe, it was also typical for monasteries and castles (small, partly self-sufficient communities) to have a fish pond.

History

Records of the use of fish ponds can be found from the early Middle Ages. "The idealized eighth-century estate of Charlemagne's capitulary de villis was to have artificial fishponds but two hundred years later, facilities for raising fish remained very rare, even on monastic estates.". As the Middle Ages progressed, fish ponds became a more common feature of urbanizing environments. 

Those with access to fish ponds had a controlled source of food, not unlike pastures for cattle and sheep, for use on days when it was not permitted to eat meat. However fish ponds were difficult to maintain. They were a mark of power and authority, since only rich nobles and institutions such as monasteries could afford to maintain them. In winter, supplying fresh food for a castle garrison was a constant struggle. Nobles had access to meat from deer parks, but this did not supply the needs of whole households. Though fish ponds required maintenance to keep them healthy, they were an elegant way of giving monasteries and noble houses access to fresh fish. 

Some of the more popular species of fish farmed in fish ponds were carp and pike. From the 14th century onward these fish proved to be a popular feature of artificial fish ponds.

Aquaculture
Fish ponds have been used in aquaculture.

They are or were common in:
 Canada
 Europe, especially in the Czech Republic (Rožmberk Pond, Velké Dářko, Lake Mácha), where common carp may be kept.
 Ireland, where medieval monks kept fish that could be eaten on Fridays, in accordance with Catholic rules of fasting
 Hawaii, United States, where the Native Hawaiians used them extensively.
 The Philippines where milkfish, tilapia, crabs, lobsters, tiger shrimp, snails and others may be kept.
 East Asia, especially in Japan with koi, trout, and white crucian carp.

Fish ponds are also being promoted in developing countries. They provide a source of food and income from the sale of fish for small farmers and can also supply irrigation needs and water for livestock. The ecosystem and production services offered by carp farming in fish ponds have immense societal and economic advantages. For example, per production cycle, common carp aquaculture in the whole Central and Eastern Europe fishponds offer at least 579 million € worth of services, some of which are realized while a larger part is intangible. European carp aquaculture in fishponds is probably cleaner than most food production sectors in the European Union, offering lesser nutrient burden to the environment than standard crop and livestock sectors.

Gallery

See also

Ancient Hawaiian aquaculture
Garden pond
Kahaluu Fish Pond
Koi pond
Raceway (aquaculture)
Raceway pond
Sea cage
Stew pond
Water garden

Notes

References
 
 Aston M (1998) Medieval fish, fisheries and fishponds in England Volumes 1–2. B.A.R. .
 Chattopadhyay GN (1998) Chemical Analysis of Fish Pond Soil and Water Daya Publishing House. .
 Compton LV (1943) Techniques of fishpond management U.S. Dept. of Agriculture.
 Delincé  G (1992) The ecology of the fish pond ecosystem Kluwer Academic Publishers. .
 Farber JM (1997) Ancient Hawaiian fishponds: can restoration succeed on Molokaʻi? Neptune House Publications. .
 Gopalakrishnan V and Coche AG (1994) Handbook on small-scale freshwater fish farming Training Series No. 24, FAO, Rome. .
 Hoare J (1870) treatise on fishponds, addressed to the nobility and gentry of Sussex'' Wyman & sons, original from Harvard University.
 IUCN (1997) Fishing for a living: the ecology and economics of fishponds in Central Europe .
 FAO (1996) Simple methods for aquaculture: Management for freshwater fish culture: Ponds and water practices Training Series No. 21/1, Rome.
 FAO (1995) Simple methods for aquaculture: Pond Construction for Freshwater Fish Culture: Building Earthen Ponds FAO Training Series No. 20/1, Rome.
 FAO (1992) Simple methods for aquaculture: Pond Construction for Freshwater Fish Culture: Pond-Farm Structures and Layouts FAO Training Series No. 20/2, Rome.
 FAO (1989) Simple methods for aquaculture: Topography: Making topographical surveys for freshwater fish culture Training Series No. 16/2, Rome.
 FAO (1981) Simple methods for aquaculture. Water for freshwater fish culture Training Series No.4, Rome.

 
Fish farming
Pond